Derkeh (also Romanized as Derkah and Darakeh; also known as Darakah-ye ‘Eyn ol Qās, Darka, and Perkeh) is a village in Sahneh Rural District, in the Central District of Sahneh County, Kermanshah Province, Iran. At the 2006 census, its population was 904, in 215 families.

References 

Populated places in Sahneh County